Konstantin Nikolaevich Lavronenko (born 20 April 1961) is a Soviet and Russian actor most commonly accredited for his performance as the mysterious father of two boys in 2003 film Vozvrashcheniye (international English title The Return). He won the Best Actor prize at the 2007 Cannes Film Festival for The Banishment.

Early life
Konstantin Lavronenko was born in Rostov-on-Don, Russian SFSR, Soviet Union in southern Russia.

Filmography

Feature films
 1984 - Still Loving, Still Hoping (Ещё Люблю, Ещё Надеюсь/Yeshcho lyublyu, yeshcho nadeyus') - Zhenya
 1992 - Andryusha (Андрюша) - Andrey 
 1998 - Composition for Victory Day (Сочинение ко Дню Победы/Sochinenie Ko Dnyu Pobedy)
 2003 - The Return (Возвращение/Vozvrashcheniye) - father
 2005 - The Master (Mistrz) - Master
 2006 - Nanjing Landscape (Нанкинский пейзаж/Nankinsky Peyzazh) - Aleksander
 2007 - The Banishment (Изгнание/Izgnanie)- Alex
 2007 - Not Gonna Get Us (Нас Не Догонишь/Nas Ne Dogonish') - Colonel Valiev
 2007 - Open The Door, It's Ded Moroz! (Откройте, Дед Мороз/Otkroyte, Ded Moroz)- Ded Moroz
 2007 - Liquidation (Ликвидация/Likvidatsiya) - Chekan
 2008 - Terra Nova (Новая Земля/Novaya Zemlya) - Zhilin
 2010 - Kajínek - Jiří Kajínek
 2010 - Zaytsev, Come On! The story of a showman (Зайцев Жги! История шоумена/Zaytsev Zhgi! Istoriya Shoumena)- Aleksander Tross
 2012 - The Three Mouse Mafia - Squeak The Mouse
 2013 - Territory (Территория/Territoriya) - Chinkov 
 2013 - The Three Musketeers (Три Мушкетёра)- Buckingham
 2016 - Earthquake
 2017 - The Last Warrior - Koschey
 2019 - Robo - general
 2020 - Coma - Yan
 2021 - The Last Warrior: Root of Evil - Koschey
 2021 - The Last Warrior: A Messenger of Darkness - Koschey

Series
 2003 - No Escape from Love (Нет Спасения от любви/Net Spaseniya Ot Lyubvi)- Savior Semen
 2005 - Archangel - Joseph
 2008 - Weapons - Kirill Reutov, FSB colonel 
 2008 - Ordered to Destroy! - Pyotr Gavrin
 2009 - Isayev - Vasily Blyukher
 2010 - Each has its Own War - Stepan Kharlamov
 2011 - Bystander - Volgin
 2011 - Made in USSR - Nikolay Vetrov
 2013 - The Price of Life - Ilya Shagin
 2014 - Catherine - Count Jean Armand de Lestocq 
 2016 - Klim - Klim
 2019 - Gold Diggers as Pavel Chistyakov

References

External links
 

1961 births
Living people
Actors from Rostov-on-Don
Soviet male film actors
Soviet male stage actors
Russian male film actors
Russian male television actors
Russian male stage actors
Cannes Film Festival Award for Best Actor winners
Honored Artists of the Russian Federation
Moscow Art Theatre School alumni